Folley is a surname. Notable people with the surname include:

A. J. Folley (1896–1981), Texas Supreme Court justice
Caitlyn Folley, American actress
Charles Teiko Folley (born 1991), Ghanaian footballer
David Folley (born 1960), English painter
Ian Folley (1963–1993), English cricketer
Jess Folley, singer
Zora Folley (1932–1972), American boxer